Pennsylvania History: A Journal of Mid-Atlantic Studies is a peer-reviewed academic journal covering the history of the Commonwealth of Pennsylvania. It is published quarterly by Penn State University Press.

External links 
 
Journal page on Penn State Press website
Pennsylvania History at Project MUSE

History of the United States journals
Penn State University Press academic journals
Quarterly journals
Publications established in 1934
English-language journals